Molly Harper is an American author of paranormal romance and general romance fiction and a member of the Romance Writers of America. Harper is best known for her Nice Girls vampire series and Naked Werewolf series.

Background
She graduated in 2000 from Western Kentucky University with a Bachelor of Arts degree in print journalism and began work as a reporter for Paducah Sun.  She currently lives in Michigan with her husband and children.

Reception
Reception for Harper's work has been positive, with her Naked Werewolf and Nice Girls series both being "Top Picks" for Romantic Times. Her novel And One Last Thing... was a 2011 finalist in the Romance Writers of America's RITA awards in the category of contemporary single title romance.

The Nice Girls series has been praised by Publishers Weekly and USA Today, with Publishers Weekly praising Nice Girls Don't Bite Their Neighbors''' "stellar supporting characters, laugh-out-loud moments, and outrageous plot twists". Booklist has also reviewed the Nice Girls series, praising Nice Girls Don't Have Fangs.And One Last Thing... has received mostly positive reviews from critics, garnering a negative review from Publishers Weekly, while gaining positive reviews from Romantic Times and Booklist.

Harper launched a women's fiction series, the Southern Eclectic series, with Sweet Tea & Sympathy in November 2017. Sweet Tea & Sympathy has received positive reviews from Publishers Weekly and the Romantic Times. The Library Journal stated, “This sweet tale of the city girl finding a home in the country launches Harper’s latest series and will go down as easy as honey on a deep-fried Twinkie.”

Harper is well-known for her success in audiobooks. Her work with voice actress Amanda Ronconi has made her a "legendary pairing" at Audible. The books in her Mystic Bayou series are released as Audible exclusives for six months before being available in ebook.

 Bibliography 

 Bluegrass 

 My Bluegrass Baby (2012)
 Rhythm and Bluegrass (2013)
 Snow Falling on Bluegrass (September 22, 2014) 

Half Moon Hollow
 Driving Mr. Dead (2011)
 The Care and Feeding of Stray Vampires (2012)
 A Witch's Handbook of Kisses and Curses (2013)
 Undead Sublet (2013)
 I'm Dreaming of an Undead Christmas (2013)
 The Dangers of Dating a Rebound Vampire (2015)
 The Single Undead Moms Club (2015)
 Fangs for the Memories (2015)
 Where the Wild Things Bite (2016)
 Big Vamp on Campus (2016)
 Accidental Sire (2016)
 Peace, Blood, and Understanding (2019)
 Nice Werewolves Don't Bite Vampires (2020)

 Mystic Bayou 
 How to Date Your Dragon (2018)
 Love and Other Wild Things (2018)
 Even Tree Nymphs Get the Blues (2019)
 Selkies are a Girl's Best Friend (2019)
 Always Be My Banshee (2020)
 One Fine Fae (2020)
 Shifters in the Night (2021)
 A Farewell to Charms (2021)

 Naked Werewolf 
 How to Flirt with a Naked Werewolf (2011)
 The Art of Seducing a Naked Werewolf (2011)
 How to Run with a Naked Werewolf (2013)

 Nice Girls/Jane Jameson 
 Nice Girls Don't Have Fangs (2009)
 Nice Girls Don't Date Dead Men (2009)
 Nice Girls Don't Live Forever (2009)
 Nice Girls Don’t Sign a Lease Without a Wedding Ring (2010)
 Nice Girls Don't Bite Their Neighbors (2012)

Sorcery and Society
 Changeling (2018)
 Fledgling (2019)
 Calling (2022)

 Southern Eclectic 

 Save a Truck, Ride a Redneck (2017)
 Sweet Tea and Sympathy (2017)
 Peachy Flippin' Keen (2018)
 Ain't She a Peach (2018)
 A Few Pecans Short of a Pie (2019)
 Gimme Some Sugar (2019)

 Starfall Point 

 Witches Get Stuff Done (2022)

Standalone titles
 And One Last Thing ... (2010)
 Better Homes and Hauntings (June 2014)
 Pasties and Poor Decisions'' (June 2021)

References

External links
 

21st-century American novelists
21st-century American women writers
American paranormal romance writers
American women novelists
Kentucky women writers
living people
novelists from Kentucky
people from Paducah, Kentucky
Western Kentucky University alumni
women romantic fiction writers
year of birth missing (living people)